Acatic  is a town and municipality, in Jalisco in central-western Mexico. The municipality covers an area of 362.39 km². The town produces mainly Spanish style shingles, brick, adobe floor tile, chia, corn, and tequila. Pueblo Viejo Tequila is bottled near by. The town is the entry "gate" to Los Altos of Jalisco.

As of 2005, the municipality had a total population of 18,551.

Government

Municipal presidents

References

Municipalities of Jalisco